Anthology is a compilation album by Ambrosia, released in 1997 on Warner Bros. Records. The album includes three new recordings, including a re-recording of the David Pack solo "I Just Can't Let Go", which was released as a single. The two new recorded tracks are "Mama Don't Understand" and "Sky Is Falling".

Track listing

Personnel
Ambrosia
David Pack – guitar, lead and backing vocals, keyboards
Chris North – keyboards, backing vocals
Joe Puerta – bass, lead and backing vocals
Burleigh Drummond – drums, backing vocals, percussion

Additional musicians
Colleen Ford – backing vocals ("Mama Don't Understand")
James Ingram – backing vocals ("I Just Can't Let Go")
Michael McDonald – backing vocals, bass ("I Just Can't Let Go")

Charts
Singles

References

External links

Ambrosia (band) albums
1997 compilation albums
Warner Records compilation albums